Integra is a subdivision of the Japanese manufacturer Onkyo, which makes a complete line of electronics consisting of home theater receivers or AV receiver, CD player, DVD player and Blu-ray player. It is a well known brand for custom residential installation industry and integrates well with home automation systems major brands where the name "Integra" comes from which was meant to say integration and fusion. Introduced by Onkyo in 1969 as a brand name under which it could market its most premium products, Integra Research became its own division in 2000.

Many home automation systems are ready to use with Integra products out of the box or have support or programming modules available for Integra products.

References

Electronics companies established in 1999
Audio equipment manufacturers of Japan
Japanese brands
1999 establishments in Japan